Gitte Munch Larsen is a Danish curler.

Teams

Women's

Mixed

References

External links

Living people
People from Hvidovre Municipality
Danish female curlers
Danish curling champions
Year of birth missing (living people)
Sportspeople from the Capital Region of Denmark